Richard Owen (December 11, 1922 – November 20, 2015) was an American attorney, jurist, and composer who served as a United States district judge of the United States District Court for the Southern District of New York.

Early life and education

The son of an opera-loving attorney, Owen was born and raised in New York City. He served in the United States Army Air Corps from 1942 to 1945, and then received an Artium Baccalaureus degree from Dartmouth College in 1945. He received a Bachelor of Laws from Harvard Law School in 1950

Career 
After earning his law degree, Owen entered private practice in New York City from 1950 to 1953. He was also an assistant professor at New York Law School from 1951 to 1953. In 1953, Owen became an assistant United States attorney for the Southern District of New York, also serving as a special assistant United States attorney general in 1954. He was a senior trial attorney in the Antitrust Division of the United States Department of Justice from 1955 to 1958. He returned to private practice in New York City from 1958 to 1974, also working as associate counsel to the New York State Commission on Alcoholic Beverage Laws from 1963 to 1964.

Owen presided over the Mafia Commission Trial and sentenced eight convicted defendants of racketeering on January 13, 1987.

Federal judicial service

On November 15, 1973, Owen was nominated by President Richard Nixon to a seat on the United States District Court for the Southern District of New York vacated by Judge Edward Cochrane McLean. Owen was confirmed by the United States Senate on December 13, 1973, and received his commission on December 19, 1973. He assumed senior status on September 30, 1989. His service terminated on November 20, 2015, due to his death in New York City.

Personal life

From 1960 until his death, Owen was married to Wisconsin-born Lynn Rasmussen, an opera singer.

Musical career

Owen was also a composer, and "dabbled in music all his life". He studied piano as a child and again once he finished law school. He studied composition with Vittorio Giannini and Robert Starer. His opera Abigail Adams, based on the lives of the second president and his wife, was first produced in 1987. Five of his art songs were published by the General Music Publishing Company between 1962 and 1973; they are known for their declamation and dramatic qualities.

Operas and other musical works

Dismissed With Prejudice, opera, mid-1950s, presented under the auspices of the New York City Bar Association
A Moment of War, one-act opera, 1958
A Fisherman Called Peter, sacred concert piece/opera, 1965
Mary Dyer, opera, 1976
The Death of the Virgin, opera, libretto by Michael Whitney Straight, 1980/1983
Abigail Adams, opera, 1987
American Stereopticon, orchestral piece, 1988, unpublished
Tom Sawyer, opera, 1989
 Rain, opera, 2003

Songs

published by General Music Publishing/Boston Music
The Impulse (1966, text by Robert Frost from The Hill Wife)
I Saw a Man Pursuing the Horizon (1966, text by Stephen Crane)
Patterns (1973, text by Amy Lowell)
There were many who went in Huddled Procession (1966, text by Stephen Crane)
Till we watch the Last Low Star (1962, text by Witter Bynner)
unpublished
I felt a funeral in my brain (1981, text by Emily Dickinson)
Morning musings (1982, text by Emily Dickinson)
The last night she lived (1981, text by Emily Dickinson)

References

Sources

External links
 
 New York Times review of Abigail Adams
 Music Associates of America article by George Sturm about Richard Owen as a composer
 Richard Owen's obituary

1922 births
2015 deaths
Dartmouth College alumni
Harvard Law School alumni
New York University faculty
Judges of the United States District Court for the Southern District of New York
United States district court judges appointed by Richard Nixon
20th-century American judges
United States Army Air Forces soldiers
United States Army personnel of World War II
20th-century classical composers
American male classical composers
American classical composers
American opera composers
Male opera composers
Musicians from New York City
20th-century American composers
Assistant United States Attorneys
20th-century American male musicians